The 1972 New York Yankees season was the 70th season for the Yankees. The team finished with a record of 79–76, finishing 6½ games behind the Detroit Tigers. New York was managed by Ralph Houk. The Yankees played at Yankee Stadium.

Offseason 
 October 13, 1971: Jim Lyttle was traded by the Yankees to the Chicago White Sox for Rich Hinton.
 December 2, 1971: Stan Bahnsen was traded by the Yankees to the Chicago White Sox for Rich McKinney.
 December 2, 1971: Terry Ley and Gary Jones were traded by the Yankees to the Texas Rangers for Bernie Allen.
 January 20, 1972: The Yankees traded a player to be named later to the Chicago Cubs for Johnny Callison. The Yankees completed the deal by sending Jack Aker to the Cubs on May 17.
 February 2, 1972: Hal Lanier was purchased by the Yankees from the San Francisco Giants.
 March 22, 1972: Danny Cater and a player to be named later were traded by the Yankees to the Boston Red Sox for Sparky Lyle. The Yankees completed the deal by sending Mario Guerrero to the Red Sox on June 30.
 March 31, 1972: Frank Tepedino was purchased by the Yankees from the Milwaukee Brewers.

Regular season 

 Felipe Alou achieved two milestones in 1972. He got the 2,000th hit of his career and hit his 200th home run of his career.
 Mickey Mantle and Joe DiMaggio were at Yankee Stadium for Old-Timers' Day on July 22, 1972. The event at the stadium brought together some of the greatest living Yankees and included an exhibition game featuring retired players.

Season standings

Record vs. opponents

Notable transactions 
 June 6, 1972: 1972 Major League Baseball Draft
Mickey Klutts was drafted by the Yankees in the 4th round.
Bob Kammeyer was drafted by the Yankees in the 21st round.
 September 7, 1972: Rich Hinton was purchased from the Yankees by the Texas Rangers.

Roster

Player stats

Batting

Starters by position 
Note: Pos = Position; G = Games played; AB = At bats; H = Hits; Avg. = Batting average; HR = Home runs; RBI = Runs batted in

Other batters 
Note: G = Games played; AB = At bats; H = Hits; Avg. = Batting average; HR = Home runs; RBI = Runs batted in

Pitching

Starting pitchers 
Note: G = Games pitched; IP = Innings pitched; W = Wins; L = Losses; ERA = Earned run average; SO = Strikeouts

Other pitchers 
Note: G = Games pitched; IP = Innings pitched; W = Wins; L = Losses; ERA = Earned run average; SO = Strikeouts

Relief pitchers 
Note: G = Games pitched; W = Wins; L = Losses; SV = Saves; ERA = Earned run average; SO = Strikeouts

Awards and honors

League leaders 
Sparky Lyle, American League leader, Saves (35)
Bobby Murcer, American League leader, Runs (102)

Farm system 

LEAGUE CHAMPIONS: West Haven

Notes

References 
1972 New York Yankees at Baseball Reference
1972 New York Yankees team page at www.baseball-almanac.com

New York Yankees seasons
New York Yankees
New York Yankees
1970s in the Bronx